The Canton of Roisel is a former canton situated in the department of the Somme and in the Picardie region of northern France. It was disbanded following the French canton reorganisation which came into effect in March 2015. It consisted of 22 communes, which joined the canton of Péronne in 2015. It had 7,667 inhabitants (2012).

Geography 
The canton is organised around the commune of Roisel in the arrondissement of Péronne. The altitude varies from 59m (Tincourt-Boucly) to 152m (Liéramont) for an average of 103m.

The canton comprised 22 communes:

Aizecourt-le-Bas
Bernes
Driencourt
Épehy
Fins
Guyencourt-Saulcourt
Hancourt
Hervilly
Hesbécourt
Heudicourt
Liéramont
Longavesnes
Marquaix
Pœuilly
Roisel
Ronssoy
Sorel
Templeux-la-Fosse
Templeux-le-Guérard
Tincourt-Boucly
Villers-Faucon
Vraignes-en-Vermandois

Population

See also
 Arrondissements of the Somme department
 Cantons of the Somme department
 Communes of the Somme department

References

Roisel
2015 disestablishments in France
States and territories disestablished in 2015